Stuart Ford may refer to:
Stuart Ford (footballer)
Stuart Ford (film producer)
Stuart Ford (law professor)